Kostyantyn Mykhaylovych Makhnovskyi (born 1 January 1989) is a Ukrainian professional footballer who plays as a goalkeeper for FC Akzhayik.

Career
Makhnovskyi began his career with Dynamo Kyiv, however he only played in the reserves.

In 2007, he joined Piotrcovia Piotrków Trybunalski, where he played twice during the 2007/2008 season. During the winter break, he was loaned out by ŁKS Łódź, where he was a backup goalkeeper and appeared in two league matches.

Before the 2008/2009 season, he signed a contract with Legia Warszawa. He made his league debut in September 2010.

In February 2011, he was loaned to FC Obolon Kyiv on a half-year deal.

Right before the start of the 2012–13 Ukrainian First League season Makhnovskyi was sold by Obolon to FC Sevastopol; this led to internal conflicts within Obolon that eventually caused the dissolution of Obolon in February 2013.

Desna Chernihiv
In 2017 he moved to Desna Chernihiv the main club in Chernihiv in Ukrainian First League. With the team he was promoted in Ukrainian Premier League after the season success of the Ukrainian First League in the season 2017–18. Here he played 60 matches and been the longest team that made most appeareances in his career.

Olimpik Donetsk and Ventspils
In 2018 he went on loan to Olimpik Donetsk and in 2019 he moved to Ventspils. On 8 August 2019, he was banned for 10 games by UEFA for his racist conduct during Europa League qualification game between FK Ventspils and Gżira United F.C., when he abused Gżira's Senegalese player Amadou Samb. Samb was disqualified for 2 games for his reaction to the abuse. In 2020, he got into the final of Latvian Football Cup. On 9 February 2021, he played against his ex-team Desna Chernihiv in a friendly match ended 3-2 for FK Ventspils in Turkey.

In July 2021, Makhnovsky became a free agent, terminated the contract with Ventspils by mutual consent of the parties. The goalkeeper has been playing for the Latvian club since 2019 and rumors state that he can continue his career at Desna.

VPK-Ahro Shevchenkivka
On 31 July 2021 he returned to Ukraine to VPK-Ahro Shevchenkivka in Ukrainian First League signed a contract for one year. On 14 August 2021 he made his debut with his new team in Ukrainian First League against Alians Lypova Dolyna in the season 2021–22. On 18 August 2021 he was in the bench in Ukrainian Cup for the Second preliminary round, against Real Pharma Odesa in the season 2021–22 getting into the Third preliminary round. On 31 August 2021 he played against Balkany Zorya in Ukrainian Cup in the season 2021–22 getting into the Round of 32. On 5 September 2021 he returned to play in Ukrainian First League against Metalist Kharkiv in the season 2021–22. On 22 September he played against SC Dnipro-1 in Ukrainian Cup for the 32round. In January 2022 he left the club with mutual agreement and rumors associate him with the possibility to move to Akzhayik.

Akzhayik
In February 2022 he moved to Akzhayik in Kazakhstan Premier League. In his first season with the team, he helped them reach the final of the 2022 Kazakhstan Cup.

Career statistics

Club

Honours
Akzhayik
 Kazakhstan Cup: runner-up: 2022

Ventspils
 Latvian Football Cup runner-up: 2020

Desna Chernihiv
 Ukrainian First League: 2017–18
 Ukrainian First League runner-up: 2016–17

Sevastopol
 Ukrainian First League: 2012–13

Legia Warsaw
 Polish SuperCup: 2008
 Ekstraklasa runner-up: 2008–09

References

External links
 
 
 

1989 births
Living people
Ukrainian footballers
Ukraine youth international footballers
Association football goalkeepers
People from Horodyshche
Ukrainian expatriate footballers
ŁKS Łódź players
FC Dynamo-3 Kyiv players
Legia Warsaw players
FC Obolon-Brovar Kyiv players
FC Sevastopol players
Ravan Baku FC players
FC Desna Chernihiv players
FC Olimpik Donetsk players
Ukrainian Premier League players
Ukrainian First League players
Azerbaijan Premier League players
Ekstraklasa players
Expatriate footballers in Poland
Ukrainian expatriate sportspeople in Poland
Expatriate footballers in Azerbaijan
FK Ventspils players
FC VPK-Ahro Shevchenkivka players
FC Akzhayik players
Latvian Higher League players
Expatriate footballers in Latvia
Ukrainian expatriate sportspeople in Latvia
Expatriate footballers in Kazakhstan
Ukrainian expatriate sportspeople in Kazakhstan
Sportspeople from Cherkasy Oblast